Natascha Maria Kampusch (born 17 February 1988) is an Austrian author and former talk show host. At the age of 10, on 2 March 1998, she was abducted and held in a secret cellar by her kidnapper Wolfgang Přiklopil for more than eight years, until she escaped on 23 August 2006. Upon her escape, Přiklopil killed himself by stepping in front of a train at a nearby station. She has written a book about her ordeal, 3,096 Days (2010), which was later adapted into a film released in 2013.

Early life 
Kampusch was raised by her mother, Brigitta Sirny (née Kampusch), and her father, Ludwig Koch, in Vienna. Kampusch's family included two adult sisters, and five nieces and nephews. Sirny and Koch separated while Kampusch was still a child and divorced after her abduction. Kampusch spent time with both of them, and had returned to her mother's home from a holiday with Koch the day before her kidnapping. At the time of her abduction, she was a student at the Brioschiweg primary school.

Controversy 
Ludwig Adamovich, head of a special commission looking into possible police failures in the investigation of the kidnapping, claimed that the time Kampusch was imprisoned  "was always better than what she had known until then". This assessment was denied by Brigitta Sirny, and Adamovich's statement was found to be defamatory by a criminal court, and he was fined €10,000. In Kampusch's 2010 book about her kidnapping, 3,096 Days, she stated that her parents slapped her, and that she was considering suicide on the day of her abduction. However, Kampusch asserted that her mother was not abusive and that her home life was better than life in captivity.

Abduction 
The 10-year-old Kampusch left her family's residence in Vienna's Donaustadt district on the morning of 2 March 1998, but failed to arrive at school or come home. A 12-year-old witness reported having seen her being dragged into a white minibus by two men, although Kampusch did not report a second man being present. A massive police effort followed in which 776 minivans were examined, including that of her kidnapper Přiklopil, who lived about half an hour from Vienna by car in the Lower Austrian town of Strasshof an der Nordbahn near Gänserndorf. He stated that he was alone at home on the morning of the kidnapping, and the police were satisfied with his explanation that he was using the minibus to transport rubble from the construction of his home.

Speculations arose of child pornography rings or organ theft, leading officials to also investigate possible links to the crimes of French serial killer Michel Fourniret. Kampusch had carried her passport with her when she left, as she had been on a family trip to Hungary a few days before, so the police extended the search abroad. Accusations against Kampusch's family complicated the issue even more.

Captivity 
During the eight years of her captivity, Kampusch was held in a small cellar underneath Přiklopil's garage. The entrance was concealed behind a cupboard. The cellar had only  of space. It had a door made of concrete and was reinforced with steel. The room had no windows and was soundproof. For the first six months of her captivity, Kampusch was not allowed to leave the chamber at any time, and for several years of her captivity, she was not allowed to leave the tiny space at night. Afterward, she spent increasing amounts of time upstairs in the rest of the house, but each night was sent back to the chamber to sleep, as well as while Přiklopil was at work.

In later years, she was seen outside in the garden alone, and Přiklopil's business partner has said that Kampusch seemed relaxed and happy when  Přiklopil and she called at his home to borrow a trailer. After her 18th birthday, she was allowed to leave the house with Přiklopil, but her kidnapper threatened to kill her if she made any noise. He later took her on a skiing trip to a resort near Vienna for a few hours. She initially denied that they had made the trip, but eventually admitted that it was true, although she said that she had no chance to escape during that time.

According to Kampusch's official statement after her escape, Přiklopil and she would get up early each morning to have breakfast together. Přiklopil gave her books, so she educated herself. She did not feel that she had missed anything during her imprisonment, but she noted, "I spared myself many things, I did not start smoking or drinking and I did not hang out in bad company", but she also said, "It was a place to despair".  She was given a television and radio to pass the time, although she was initially only allowed to watch taped programs and listen to foreign radio stations so that she would not be aware of the publicised search for her. At one point, she tried to escape by jumping out of a car.

A large portion of Kampusch's time upstairs was spent doing housework for Přiklopil and cooking for him. Dietmar Ecker, Kampusch's media advisor, said that Přiklopil "would beat her so badly that she could hardly walk". Přiklopil would starve her to make her physically weak and unable to escape. Kampusch was also raped by Přiklopil.

Přiklopil had warned Kampusch that the doors and windows of the house were booby-trapped with high explosives. He also claimed to be carrying a gun and that he would kill her and the neighbors if she attempted to escape. Nevertheless, Kampusch on one occasion fantasized about chopping his head off with an axe, although she quickly dismissed the idea. She also attempted to make noise during her early years of captivity by throwing bottles of water against the walls.
She said that on trips out with Přiklopil, she had attempted to attract attention, but in vain.

Escape 
The 18-year-old Kampusch escaped from Přiklopil's house on 23 August 2006. At 12:53 pm, she was cleaning and vacuuming her kidnapper's white van  in the garden when Přiklopil got a call on his mobile phone. Because of the vacuum's loud noise, he walked away to take the call. Kampusch left the vacuum cleaner running and ran away, unseen by Přiklopil, who completed the phone call without any sign of being disturbed or distracted. Kampusch ran for some 200 meters (218 yards) through neighboring gardens and a street, jumping fences, and asking passers-by to call the police, but they paid her no attention. After about five minutes, she knocked on the window of a 71-year-old neighbour known as Inge T, saying, "I am Natascha Kampusch". The neighbor called the police, who arrived at 1:04 pm. Later, Kampusch was taken to the police station in the town of Deutsch-Wagram.

Kampusch was identified by a scar on her body, by her passport (which was found in the room where she had been held), and by DNA tests. She was in good physical health, although she looked pale and shaken and weighed only ; she weighed  when she disappeared eight years earlier. Her body mass index had reached as low as 14.8 (normal BMI: 18.5 to 24.9), and she grew only  during her captivity.

Kidnapper
Wolfgang Přiklopil (14 May 1962 – 23 August 2006) was an Austrian communications technician of Czech origin. He was born to Karl and Waltraud Přiklopil in Vienna, and was an only child. His father was a cognac salesman and his mother was a shoe saleswoman. Přiklopil worked at Siemens for a time as a communications technician.

Přiklopil escaped  in his red BMW sports car that was later found in a Vienna car park; knowing that the police were after him, he committed suicide that night by jumping in front of an oncoming train near the Wien Nord station in Vienna. He had apparently planned to end his own life rather than be caught, having told Kampusch, "they would not catch him alive".

Evidence recovery was complicated, as Přiklopil's only computer was a 1980s Commodore 64, which is incompatible with modern-day data-recovery programs. Before Kampusch escaped, Přiklopil was trying to procure false papers as a Czech citizen to "begin a new life" with Kampusch.

Aftermath 
In her official statement, Kampusch said, "I don't want and will not answer any questions about personal or intimate details". After Kampusch's escape, police investigated whether Přiklopil had an accomplice, but they eventually determined that he acted alone.

Kampusch sympathized with her captor in the documentary Natascha Kampusch: 3096 days in captivity. She said, "I feel more and more sorry for himhe's a poor soul". According to police, she "cried inconsolably" when she was told that he was dead, and she lit a candle for him at the morgue. She has, however, referred to her captor as a "criminal".

Newspapers quoting unnamed psychologists suggested that Kampusch might suffer from Stockholm syndrome, but Kampusch says that this is not the case. She suggests that people who use this term about her are disrespectful of her and do not allow her the right to describe and analyze the complex relationship that she had with her kidnapper in her own words.

Interviews 
After reportedly "hundreds of requests for an interview" with the teenager, "with media outlets offering vast sums of money", Kampusch was interviewed by Austrian public broadcaster ORF. The interview was broadcast on 6 September 2006 with her approval. ORF did not pay a fee for its interview but agreed to forward any proceeds from selling the interview to other channels, forecasted to total 300,000 euros, to be donated to women in Africa and Mexico by Kampusch. Likewise she was planning projects to help these women. Interest was enormous.

The newspaper Kronen Zeitung and newsweekly NEWS also interviewed Kampusch. The interview was published on 6 September 2006. Both press interviews were given in return for a package including housing support, a long-term job offer, and help with her education.

On 16 June 2008, the newspaper The Times published an in-depth interview with Kampusch by Bojan Pancevski and Stefanie Marsh.

On 17 February 2010, the British TV network Channel 5 broadcast an hour-long documentary about the case, including an exclusive interview with Kampusch:  Natascha: The Girl in the Cellar.

Books 
The book Girl in the Cellar: The Natascha Kampusch Story by Allan Hall and Michael Leidig appeared in November 2006, written in English. Kampusch's lawyer described the book as being both speculative and premature and therefore planned to take legal action against it.

Together with two journalists, Kampusch's mother Brigitta Sirny wrote a book about the ordeal, Verzweifelte Jahre ("Desperate Years"). Kampusch appeared at the initial presentation of the book in August 2007, but did not want to be photographed or interviewed. Sirny writes that she did not have much contact with Kampusch after the escape because Kampusch was shielded from the outside world.

Kampusch wrote a book about her ordeal, 3096 Tage (3096 Days), published in September 2010. It was adapted into a movie, 3096 Days, in 2013.

On 12 August 2016, Natascha Kampusch released her second book titled 10 Years of Freedom.

Film adaptations 
On 17 June 2010, German film-maker and director Bernd Eichinger announced that he was making a film based on Kampusch's captivity and wanted Kate Winslet to star in the film. The film was Eichinger's last before his sudden death on 24 January 2011; Kampusch attended his funeral.

On 15 April 2012, German newspaper Welt am Sonntag reported that the film would feature Antonia Campbell-Hughes as Kampusch and Thure Lindhardt as Přiklopil.
Ruth Toma completed Eichinger's unfinished screenplay and the film was directed by Sherry Hormann. It was also cinematographer Michael Ballhaus's final film. The film 3096 Days (3096 Tage) was released on 28 February 2013.

In 2011, the Austrian film Michael, which has a plot that resembles the Natascha Kampusch case, was released.

Media endeavors 
Kampusch established her own website containing personal information including pictures of herself on 5 December 2007. She had her own talk show on the new Austria TV channel, PULS 4, starting on 1 June 2008. The show had the working title of In Conversation with…Natascha Kampusch and eventually premiered as Natascha Kampusch trifft (Natascha Kampusch meets...). It ran for three episodes.

House 

The house where Kampusch was imprisoned was built by Přiklopil's grandfather, Oskar Přiklopil, after World War II. During the Cold War period, Oskar and his son Karl built a bomb shelter, thought to be the origin of Kampusch's cellar prison. Přiklopil took over the house in 1984 following his grandmother's death.

Kampusch now owns the house in which she was imprisoned. It was reported that she claimed the house from Přiklopil's estate because she wanted to protect it from vandals and being torn down; she also noted that she has visited it since her escape. When the third anniversary of her escape approached, it was revealed she had become a regular visitor at the property and was cleaning it out.

In January 2010, Kampusch said she had retained the house because it was such a big part of her formative years, also stating that she would fill in the cellar if it is ever sold, adamant that it will never become a macabre museum to her lost adolescence. In 2011, the cellar was filled in;  Kampusch still owned the house.

See also 
 Fritzl case
 Jaycee Dugard
 Li Hao
 Elizabeth Smart
 List of kidnappings
 List of solved missing person cases

References

Further reading 
 Natascha Kampusch, 3,096 Days, (Penguin, 2010) .
 Allan Hall and Michael Leidig, The Girl in the Cellar, (Hodder, 2009) .
 Natascha Kampusch, mit Corinna Milborn und Heike Gronemeier: 3096 Tage. List, Berlin 2010, .
 Pelu, Martin: Der Fall Natascha Kampusch. Tectum, Marburg 2010, ; 2013 auch als E-Book, .
 Kathrin Röggla: Die Beteiligten, Theaterstück, 2009
 Sirny-Kampusch, Brigitta:  Verzweifelte Jahre, ein Leben ohne Natascha.  Aufgezeichnet von Andrea Fehringer und Thomas Köpf, Ueberreuter, Wien 2007, .

External links 

 Natascha Kampusch's official website
 English translation by International Herald Tribune of open letter released by Kampusch on 28 August 2006
 Diagram and pictures of the hidden room by Federal Criminal Police Office of Austria

1988 births
1990s missing person cases
Austrian autobiographers
Austrian television presenters
Austrian women television presenters
Formerly missing people
Kidnapped Austrian people
Kidnapped children
Kidnappings in Austria
Living people
Missing person cases in Austria
Writers from Vienna